The British Amusement Catering Trade Association represents the amusement machine supply chain on behalf of its 500 members.

History
It was formed in 1974.

Structure
It has four sectors:
 Family Entertainment Centres
The operation of amusement and gaming machines in amusement parks, piers, Family Entertainment Centers, prize bingo establishments and other similar premises used wholly or mainly for the purpose of providing amusements at coastal resorts and inland amusement parks
 Machine Suppliers
The supply installation and maintenance of gaming and amusement machines to premises of which the owner of the machine is not the occupier e.g. pubs, clubs, etc.
 Adult Gaming Centre's
The operation of gaming and amusement machines in Adult Gaming Centers and similar premises not covered in the Family Entertainment Sector (Entry to such premises permitted to over 18s only)
 Manufacturers & Distributors
The manufacture, export, import, distribution, repair and conversion of machines and component parts

Activities
It represents the pay-to-play leisure industry in Great Britain. Currently it represents the interests of over 600 companies and over 1,000 individuals. It is a member of the European umbrella group EUROMAT.

In June 2018, BACTA made a £14,000 donation to gambling charity Young Gamblers Education Trust (YGAM).

See also
 Gambling Commission - took over from the Gaming Board for Great Britain in 2007

References

Trade associations based in the United Kingdom
Video game organizations
Video arcades
Leisure companies of the United Kingdom
Gambling in the United Kingdom
Organizations established in 1974
Organisations based in the City of London
1974 establishments in the United Kingdom